The Sinking Citizenship are an Australian rock band, formed in 2002 in Melbourne, Australia.

Career
After forming in 2002 and playing the local scene in Melbourne, Australia, the band began in 2003 to gain an amount of attention, their self-released first EP (The Sinking Citizenship EP) debuting at number 2 in independent radio, with strong support from local and national radio stations (including Xfm London) leading to a sell-out launch. The band recorded their first album, Broadcasting Germs, in the second half of 2003, using mostly equipment 'borrowed' from others without their knowledge. The album was released in 2004 on UXB Recordings, and in April 2005 was released in the UK and much of Europe on Sweet Nothing Records, distributed by Cargo Records. In June, a limited edition (500 only) single, Shake was released in the UK on Fantastic Plastic Records. The band then recorded their second  album, Delete then Repeat (partially written in London and Berlin), released in 2006 on UXB Records.

Discography

Albums
 Broadcasting Germs (2004)
 Delete then Repeat (2006)

Singles
 "Shake" (2005)

EPs
 The Sinking Citizenship EP (2003)

Compilation appearances
 Make Mixtapes Not War – Unstable Ape compilation (2003)

References

External links
 Official MySpace
 Fantastic Plastic Records page

Victoria (Australia) musical groups
Fantastic Plastic Records artists
Australian indie rock groups